Forces Command is a military formation in use in at least two different armies:
Forces Command (Australia)
United States Army Forces Command